Aisha Nawaz is a Pakistani politician who was a member of the Provincial Assembly of the Punjab since August 2018 and deseated by election commission on voting for Hamza Shabaz against the party(PTI) policy.

Political career

She was elected to the Provincial Assembly of the Punjab as a candidate of Pakistan Tehreek-e-Insaf (PTI) on a reserved seat for women in 2018 Pakistani general election. She de-seated due to vote against party policy for Chief Minister of Punjab election  on 16 April 2022.

References

Date of birth missing (living people)
Living people
Punjabi people
Punjab MPAs 2018–2023
Pakistan Tehreek-e-Insaf MPAs (Punjab)
Year of birth missing (living people)